Ta Pyi Thu Ma Shwe Htar is a 1994 Burmese drama film, directed by Sin Yaw Mg Mg starring Kyaw Thu and May Than Nu. It was based on the popular novel "Ta Pyi Thu Ma Shwe Htar", written by Tekkatho Phone Naing.

Cast
Kyaw Thu as Myat Swe
May Than Nu as Htar
Aung Pyae as U Chan Thar
Zin Min as Tin Lay
Wyne as Khin Maung Win
Cho Thet Zin as Htar Nge
Tin Htun as U Tin Latt
Nwet Nwet San as Daw Khin Lay
Yan Paing Soe as U Tin Lay
Kay Thwe Moe as Daw Khin Aye
May Kyi Thein as May May Gyi
Min Min as Moe Kya Shwe Ko

Awards

References

1994 films
1990s Burmese-language films
Burmese drama films
Films shot in Myanmar
1994 drama films